The 2017–18 Tennessee Tech Golden Eagles men's basketball team represented Tennessee Technological University during the 2017–18 NCAA Division I men's basketball season. The Golden Eagles, led by seventh-year head coach Steve Payne, played their home games at the Eblen Center in Cookeville, Tennessee as members of the Ohio Valley Conference. They finished the season 19–14, 10–8 in OVC play to finish in a tie for fifth place. They defeated SIU Edwardsville in the first round of the OVC tournament to advance to the quarterfinals where they lost to Jacksonville State.

Previous season 
The Eagles finished the season 12–20, 8–8 in OVC play to finish in a tie for fourth place in the East Division. As the No. 6 seed in the OVC tournament, they lost in the first round to  Murray State.

Preseason 
In a vote of conference coaches and sports information directors, Tennessee Tech was picked to finish in 5th place in the OVC. Aleksa Jugovic was named to the 2017–18 Preseason All-OVC Men's Basketball Team.

After five years of divisional play in the OVC, the conference eliminated divisions for the 2017–18 season. Additionally, for the first time, each conference team will play 18 conference games.

Roster

Schedule and results

|-
!colspan=9 style=| Non-conference regular season

|-
!colspan=9 style=| Ohio Valley Conference regular season

|-
!colspan=9 style=| Ohio Valley Conference tournament

Source

References

Tennessee Tech Golden Eagles men's basketball seasons
Tennessee Tech
Tennessee Tech Golden Eagles men's basketball
Tennessee Tech Golden Eagles men's basketball